Matt Villa is an Australian film editor, most famous for editing The Great Gatsby, for which he won Best Editing at the 3rd AACTA Awards alongside Jason Ballantine and Jonathan Redmond. Villa won his second AACTA Award the following year for Predestination.

Filmography

References

External links

Living people
Australian film editors
Year of birth missing (living people)